Gerome Sapp (born February 8, 1981) is a former American football safety. He was originally drafted by the Baltimore Ravens in the sixth round of the 2003 NFL Draft. He played college football at Notre Dame.

High school career
Sapp attended Lamar High School where he was an All-American and was in the USA Today for the 100 top football players in his class. He participated in the Texas vs. California High School Football All-Star game.

College career
Sapp attended the University of Notre Dame, and finished his college football career with 155 tackles, 3 fumble recoveries and 5 INTs, adding 9 passes defended and 1 forced fumble.

Professional career
Sapp was drafted in the 2003 NFL Draft by the Baltimore Ravens and would later play for the Indianapolis Colts before going back to Baltimore. Through his career, Sapp had 106 tackles.

External links
http://www.pro-football-reference.com/players/S/SappGe20.htm

1981 births
Living people
African-American players of American football
American football safeties
Baltimore Ravens players
Indianapolis Colts players
Lamar High School (Houston, Texas) alumni
Notre Dame Fighting Irish football players
Players of American football from Houston
21st-century African-American sportspeople
20th-century African-American people